Wilkinson (also called Buffalo) is an unincorporated community in Wilkinson County, Mississippi, United States.

It is located on the north shore of the Buffalo River.

References

Unincorporated communities in Wilkinson County, Mississippi
Unincorporated communities in Mississippi